Typophorus nigritus is a species of leaf beetle in the subfamily Eumolpinae. It is found in North, Central, and South America.

Two subspecies, T. nigritus nitidulus and T. nigritus viridicyaneus, are known as pests of sweet potatoes.

Subspecies
There are 13 subspecies of T. nigritus:
 Typophorus nigritus chalceus Lefèvre, 1877 – Mexico
 Typophorus nigritus coronadoi Bechyné, 1948 – Mexico
 Typophorus nigritus cretifer Bechyné, 1953 – Guatemala
 Typophorus nigritus erbeni Bechyné, 1948 – Trinidad
 Typophorus nigritus interpositus Bechyné, 1951 – Costa Rica
 Typophorus nigritus lucens Bechyné, 1953 – Brazil
 Typophorus nigritus molnari Bechyné, 1953 – Brazil
 Typophorus nigritus nigritus (Fabricius, 1801) – Guyana, Venezuela, Colombia
 Typophorus nigritus nitidulus (Fabricius, 1801) – Brazil, Argentina, Paraguay, Uruguay, Bolivia, Peru
 Typophorus nigritus obliquus Baly, 1859 – Guatemala, Panama, Colombia, Venezuela
 Typophorus nigritus paradoxus Jacoby, 1882 – Honduras, Guatemala
 Typophorus nigritus punctatissimus Bechyné, 1948 – Mexico
 Typophorus nigritus viridicyaneus (Crotch, 1873) (sweetpotato leaf beetle) – USA, Mexico

References

Eumolpinae
Beetles of North America
Beetles of Central America
Beetles of South America
Taxa named by Johan Christian Fabricius
Beetles described in 1801
Sweet potatoes